East Devon Eagles are a rugby league team based in Exmouth, Devon. They play in the South West Division of the Rugby League Conference.

History
After a campaign by the Rugby Football League to form new clubs in the South West a rugby league game was staged between East Devon Eagles and Devon Sharks, then based at Newton Abbot. The Eagles were Devon Cup winners in 2006.

They joined the newly formed South West Division of the Rugby League Conference in 2007. They won the Devon Challenge Cup in a final against Plymouth Titans that was featured on Sky Sports. East Devon Eagles finished level on points with Devon Sharks who they beat 38-22 in a semi-final play-off.

They won the RLC South West Division in 2008 and made it to the final of the Devon Cup but lost 31-20 to Plymouth Titans.

They completed the 2009 regular season unbeaten before going down to Devon Sharks in the Grand Final. The Eagles won the successor to the Devon Cup, the South West Cup, beating Exeter Centurions at Plymouth Albion's Brickfields ground.

Club honours
 Devon / South West Challenge Cup: 2006, 2007, 2009
 RLC South West: 2008, 2010

External links
 Official site
 East Devon Eagles on Facebook

Rugby League Conference teams
Rugby league teams in Devon
Exmouth
2006 establishments in England
Rugby clubs established in 2006
English rugby league teams